Fonck is a surname. Notable people with this surname are:

Bernard Fonck (born 1973), Belgian equestrian
Catherine Fonck (born 1968), Belgian nephrologist and politician
Raymond Fonck (born 1951), American Physicist and Professor
Cecilia Bolocco Fonck (born 1965), Miss Universe 1987
Johny Fonck (1920–2008), Luxembourgian athlete
René Fonck (1894–1953), French World War I flying ace
René Fonck (canoeist) (1923–2018), Luxembourgian sprint canoer